Ahmed Dalah is a Saudi Arabian football player.

External links
Eurosport.fr Profile 
Goal.com
Goalaz.com Profile 
Match-Endirect.com Profile 
2010-11 slstat.com Profile
2011-12 slstat.com Profile
2012-13 slstat.com Profile

1987 births
Living people
Saudi Arabian footballers
Wej SC players
Ittihad FC players
Al-Faisaly FC players
Al-Shoulla FC players
Saudi First Division League players
Saudi Professional League players
Association football defenders